is a Japanese anime series. The anime is based on Japanese cell phone service NTT DoCoMo's dating simulation game released on August 15, 2005. The anime, directed by Takayuki Inagaki, premiered on both Tokyo MX TV and TV Saitama on October 1, 2006. The anime's 13 episodes were released between October 1, 2006, and December 24, 2006. An extra episode was released on July 19, 2007.

Media

Game
The game was played on Japanese cell phone network NTT DoCoMo. The goal of the game was to form romantic relationships and hear love songs. Speech recognition software was employed to allow the player to directly converse with the characters. The player made story choices, spoke with characters, and heard characters conversing with each other. Different images were displayed on the player's phone depending on conversation choices and clothing selections. The game offered multiple endings depending on player decisions throughout the game.

Anime
In the anime, the main character is Yuta rather than his sister. For that reason, the anime has more of a homosexual element than the game.

The anime uses two pieces of theme music. "Hanashitaku wa nai" by Flame is the series' opening theme, while "LOOK UP DAYS" by Michihiro Kuroda is the series' ending theme.

Victor Entertainment released seven DVDs for the anime, each containing two episodes of the anime. The first DVD was released on January 25, 2007. The second DVD was released on February 21, 2007. The third DVD was released on March 21, 2007. The fourth DVD was released on April 25, 2007. The fifth DVD was released on May 23, 2007. The sixth DVD was released on June 21, 2007. The final DVD was released on July 19, 2007.

Episode listing

Game CDs
Serendipity released three game music CDs. The first two CDs, Marginal Prince Songs 1 and Marginal Prince Songs 2, were both released on September 1, 2005. Both CDs were sung by Shun Someya, Ryotaro Okiayu and  Hisayoshi Suganuma. The final CD, Marginal Prince Songs 2.1 -Stanislav Sokurov-, was released on January 22, 2006.

Drama CD
Serendipity released a drama CD, called Yuta Gakuin Tochaku Hen, for the anime on September 15, 2006.

References

External links
 Official website 
 

Shōjo manga
Japanese LGBT-related animated television series